A Midsummer's Nightmare may refer to:
 "A Midsummer's Nightmare", an episode of Lexx
 "A Midsummer's Nightmare", an episode of The Suite Life of Zack & Cody
 A Midsummer's Nightmare (novel), by Garry Kilworth
 A Midsummer's Nightmare (film), a 2017 Lifetime Television Movie